Ángelo Matías Pizzorno Bracco (born October 21, 1992) is a Uruguayan footballer who plays as a centre back for S.D. Aucas in Ecuador.

Life and career
Pizzorno was born in Santa Lucía, in the Canelones Department of Uruguay. He was a late entrant into professional football. He joined his first amateur club, Wanderers de Santa Lucía, as an under-14 in 2005, and had a short spell in the youth system of Primera División club Danubio, but soon returned to Wanderers, where he played alongside his brother Gonzalo. He represented Canelones in the Copa Nacional de Selecciones, both at under-18 and senior level, and was a member of the team that won the southern regional title in 2013–14, scoring twice in the final as Canelones beat Colonia 5–3 on aggregate.

In January 2015, Pizzorno signed for Primera División club Cerro. He was an unused substitute on the last day of the 2015 Clausura in June, and made his professional debut at the age of 24 the following February, on the first day of the 2016 Clausura, coming on after 84 minutes as his team lost 2–1 to Peñarol. He made eight appearances as Cerro finished third in the table, which enabled them to enter the 2017 Copa Libertadores at the second qualifying stage. They were drawn to meet Unión Española of Chile. Despite Pizzorno making the score 2–2 in the first leg, Cerro conceded late in the match, and went on to lose the tie 5–2 on aggregate.

His performance in a losing cause impressed the opposition's manager, Martín Palermo, to the extent that as soon as the transfer window opened, he signed the player. He started in all but one of the 2017 Torneo de Transición matches as the team finished as runners-up.

References

External links
 

1992 births
Living people
People from Santa Lucía, Uruguay
Association football defenders
Uruguayan footballers
Uruguayan expatriate footballers
C.A. Cerro players
Unión Española footballers
Burgos CF footballers
Cienciano footballers
Uruguayan Primera División players
Chilean Primera División players
Segunda División B players
Peruvian Primera División players
Uruguayan expatriate sportspeople in Chile
Uruguayan expatriate sportspeople in Spain
Uruguayan expatriate sportspeople in Peru
Expatriate footballers in Chile
Expatriate footballers in Spain
Expatriate footballers in Peru